Big Brother Brasil 16 was the sixteenth season of Big Brother Brasil which premiered January 19, 2016 with the season finale airing April 5, 2016 on the Rede Globo. The show is produced by Endemol Globo and it was the last presented by journalist Pedro Bial, replaced by Tiago Leifert in 2017, after leaving the sports department, 1 year before the premiere of the talk show Conversa com Bial.

The grand prize is R$1.5 million with tax allowances, with a R$150,000 prize offered to the runner-up and a R$50,000 prize offered to the 3rd place. 19 Year Old Student Munik Nunes won this season on Day 78.

The game

Changes in the voting system
For the first time in the program since its debut, there was a change in the voting system of the show. From the fifth week of the season, the public's vote became regional based. The candidate who achieves a simple majority of votes in each region of Brazil (Midwest, Northeast, North, Southeast and South) by internet gets a point. Also earn one point the candidate who obtains a simple majority of all votes by calls and SMS. Thus, there are six points in total: five per geographic region and another by SMS and telephone. In case of a tied score, the contestant with the most votes is evicted. The votes from outside is distributed equally among the five regions of Brazil.

Power of No

Big Phone

Housemates
The cast list with the first 12 housemates was unveiled on January 13, 2016.
On day 3, four potential competitors (Fernanda, Geralda, Matheus and William) entered the apartment to compete by public vote for the 13th and 14th housemate's spot.

Future appearances

In 2017, Matheus Lisboa appeared in A Fazenda 9, he finished in 3rd place.

In 2018, Munik Nunes appeared with her husband Anderson Felício in Power Couple Brasil 3, they finished in 3rd place.

In 2018, Ana Paula Renault appeared in A Fazenda 10, she finished in 14th place.

In 2022, Matheus Lisboa appeared on De Férias com o Ex Caribe: Salseiro VIP as a ex.

Voting history
 Key
  – Generation Play
  – Generation Love
  – Generation Turn
  – Generation Ensures

Notes 

 : Alan and Daniel gained R$10,000 and Ronan and Tamiel two immunities, for having won the first HoH competition in group.
 : Fernanda, Geralda, Matheus and William entered on Day 3, already nominated. The audience should vote for two of them to become a full housemates. On Day 6, Geralda and Matheus were the winners of the vote, becoming official housemates, while Fernanda and William were evicted from the house. By winning the voting, Geralda and Matheus had immunity on the first nomination.
 :  Ronan answered the Big Phone and won an extra immunity.
 :  Week 3 featured a fake round of nominations. The public voted for which housemate between the two nominees Ana Paula and Ronan, would enter the Apartment and be able to watch their fellow housemates on a television screen for two days, and then return to the house on Thursday, with immunity. Ana Paula won the vote and was fake evicted on day 22.
 : Both Renan and Tamiel won the HoH's challenge this week. Tamiel chose to win the immunity, while Renan gained R$10,000 but was still eligible to be nominated by housemates.
 : From this eviction onwards, eviction voting will not be based on the total number of votes received. Instead it will be regional based.
 : Both Renan and Tamiel won the HoH's challenge this week. Renan chose to win the immunity and R$10,000, while Tamiel gained a car but was still eligible to be nominated by housemates.
 :  Tamiel answered the Big Phone and had to choose two housemates to wear a bracelet (Ana Paula and Ronan). On Sunday, he nominated one of them (Ana Paula) automatically for eviction. He should keep the informations as a secret until Sunday in order to escape from being automatically nominated.
 : Ana Paula was ejected on day 47 due to violent behaviour towards Renan.
 :  Host Pedro Bial announced on day 45 that the contestant who received immunity by the PoI holder would have the power to make a killer nomination before the HoH and house's votes. Geralda nominated Adélia.
 : Munik and Renan received the most nominations with three each. Renan, the Head of Household, had the casting vote and chose Munik to be the third nominee.
 :  Week 8 featured a twist. The last housemate to enter in the Diary Room on Sunday morning would enter the Apartment and be able to watch their fellow housemates on a television screen and then return to the house on Sunday night it nominated one housemate automatically for eviction. Renan won the task and chose Geralda to be the first nominee.
 : There were no nominations at week 10. The last four housemates competed in four competitions during four days (Days 66, 69, 71 and 73) to decide the next HoH.
 : Maria Claudia won the Head of Household competition, won immunity and nominated Geralda for eviction. Since Munik and Ronan's votes would cancel each other out, only Geralda was eligible to nominate. She chose Ronan to be the second nominee.
 :   In the last competition of the season, Maria Claudia won the endurance challenge and become the first finalist. Therefore, Munik and Ronan were automatically nominated for eviction by default.
 :  For the final, the public will vote for the housemate they want to win Big Brother Brasil 16.

Have and Have-Nots

On week 2, the whole house became Have-Nots due to punishment for Renan eating an apple, which is not included in the have-not diet.

On week 6, the whole house became Have due to the Guaraná Antarctica surprise.

Ratings

References

External links
 Official Site 

2016 Brazilian television seasons
16